Józef Smoczek (17 January 1908 – 29 August 1984) was a Polish footballer. He played in four matches for the Poland national football team from 1930 to 1935.

References

External links
 

1908 births
1984 deaths
Polish footballers
Poland international footballers
Place of birth missing
Association footballers not categorized by position